"Seasons" is the third single by English singer-songwriter Olly Murs from his fourth studio album Never Been Better (2014) and was released on 27 March 2015. The song was co-written and co-produced by OneRepublic frontman Ryan Tedder. Murs announced on his Twitter account that "Seasons" would be the third single from Never Been Better on 10 February 2015.

Music video
The music video to "Seasons" was uploaded on Murs's Vevo account on 16 March 2015. The video features Murs trying to win back his girlfriend after she catches him in bed with another woman. She rejects his advances at first but at the end of the video, she and Murs get back together.

Live performances
Murs has performed "Seasons" on the quarter-final of the fourth series of The Voice UK and on The Jonathan Ross Show. He also performed it on Sunday Night at the Palladium.

Charts

References

2015 songs
Songs written by Ryan Tedder
Songs written by Ammar Malik
Songs written by Noel Zancanella
Song recordings produced by Ryan Tedder
Syco Music singles
Olly Murs songs
Epic Records singles
2015 singles